McGuire and Hester is an engineering, design, and construction company. McGuire and Hester has two offices located in Oakland and Sacramento, California.

History

In the 1890s Michael J. McGuire emigrated from Ireland to California. In 1926, he started installing sewers for houses in Oakland. In 1931, McGuire asked his friend Mike Hester to be his business partner. The company “McGuire and Hester” was founded in 1947. A year later, McGuire died, and Hester purchased all the shares in the company.

By the 1970s, second generation expanded operations from just construction to grading and paving, concrete and mechanical work.

In the 1990s, the company added landscaping, architectural concrete and aggregate divisions operations. They also started working on projects in Oregon and Nevada.

In 2003 McGuire and Hester became 100% employee owned (ESOP) company.

Projects

 Alameda County Courthouse, Downtown Oakland, CA
 Laid all the underground utilities at the Oakland Army Base and Naval Supply Depot, Oakland, CA
 Installed a section of the Hetch Hetchy water system, San Francisco, CA
 Created a prototype for the California Aqueduct Canal, CA
 Beautified Market Street, San Francisco, CA
 Beautified the Powell Street Cable Car and Turntable, San Francisco, CA
 Embellished Napa Downtown Mall, Napa, CA
 Reconstructed the 12th Street Dam Area near Lake Merritt, Oakland, CA 
 Palo Alto Medical Foundation San Carlos Center - Sitework including landscape, concrete and green roof

Awards

STAR 101.3
 Coolest Place to Work in the Bay Area (2014)
San Francisco Business Times
Largest Commercial Contractors in the Bay Area (2014)
Largest Commercial Contractors in the Greater Bay Area (2015)
Largest East Bay Private Companies (2014)
Mercury News Group
Best Place to Work (2014)
American Society of Civil Engineers
Construction Project of the Year (2014) - Dorsey Drive Interchange Project
American Public Works Association
Project of the Year (2013) - Del Paso Boulevard Streetscape
Bay Area News Group 
 Top Workplaces (2012 - 2015)
Esop Association
 Total Communications Runner Up Program Award (2010)

References

External links
 McGuire and Hester Web site
 ASCE 2014 Awards Banquet

Companies based in Oakland, California
Construction and civil engineering companies established in 1947
1947 establishments in California
Employee-owned companies of the United States
Construction and civil engineering companies of the United States